Tereza Master (born 21 September 1988) is a Malawian long distance runner who specialises in the marathon. She competed in the women's marathon event at the 2016 Summer Olympics where she finished in 98th place with a time of 2:48:34, a national record.

References

External links
 

1988 births
Living people
Malawian female long-distance runners
Malawian female marathon runners
Place of birth missing (living people)
Athletes (track and field) at the 2016 Summer Olympics
Olympic athletes of Malawi
Athletes (track and field) at the 2014 Commonwealth Games
Commonwealth Games competitors for Malawi